KPF may stand for:

 Kohn Pedersen Fox, an American architectural firm
 Kefagn Patriotic Front, an Ethiopian political faction